A Place of Execution is a crime novel by Val McDermid, first published in 1999. The novel won the Los Angeles Times Book Prize, the 2001 Dilys Award, was shortlisted for both the Gold Dagger and the Edgar Award, and was chosen by The New York Times as one of the most notable books of the year.

Plot
The novel has two parallel storylines; the first, set in 1963, follows Detective Inspector George Bennett, who attempts to locate a missing girl in Derbyshire. The second, set in the present day, follows journalist Catherine Heathcote, whose plans to publish a story of the investigation are derailed when Bennett inexplicably stops cooperating and she attempts to find out why.

Television adaption
The novel was adapted for TV by Patrick Harbinson and was made into a 3-part TV drama shown on ITV 1 (1st episode screened 22 Sept 08). It was produced in the UK by Coastal Productions in collaboration with ITV  ITV from 22 September to 6 October 2008. The series was nominated for The UK TV Dagger at the 2009 Crime Thriller Awards, and star Juliet Stevenson was awarded Best Actress on 21 October 2009. It also aired as a three-part series in November 2009 in the US as part of the anthology series Masterpiece: Contemporary!.  The teleplay won the 2010 Edgar Allan Poe Award for best television episode teleplay from the Mystery Writers of America.

Awards
 Dilys Award 2001 
 Macavity Awards 2001 
 Anthony Award 2001

References

External links
 Podcast of Val McDermid talking about A Place of Execution  on the BBC's World Book Club
 
Trailer, ITV production, "Place of Execution"
Cast and credits, ITV production

1999 British novels
Novels by Val McDermid
Novels set in Derbyshire
Novels set in the 1960s
Fiction set in 1963
Historical crime novels
Anthony Award-winning works
Macavity Award-winning works
Barry Award-winning works
Dilys Award-winning works
HarperCollins books